Jacob Reuben (born 28 February 1931) was an Indian cricketer. he was a right-handed batsman and wicket-keeper who played for Maharashtra. He was born in Ahmednagar.

Reuben made a single first-class appearance for the side, during the 1952-53 season, against Holkar. From the tailend, he scored 1 not out in each innings in which he batted.

Reuben took two catches from behind the stumps, those of Hiralal Gaekwad and Narayan Nivsarkar.

References

1931 births
Living people
Indian cricketers
Maharashtra cricketers
People from Ahmednagar